The 2003 UNCAF Interclub Cup was the 21st edition of the international club football competition held in the UNCAF region representing the seven nations of Central America.  Costa Rican side Deportivo Saprissa obtained their fifth regional title after defeating Comunicaciones F.C. in the final match.  Both clubs, along with third placed Liga Deportiva Alajuelense, qualified to the 2004 CONCACAF Champions' Cup.

Qualifying round

 Alajuelense won 15–0 on aggregate score.

First round

Group 1
Diriamba, Estelí, and Managua, Nicaragua

{{Football box collapsible
| date       = 
| time       = 
| round      = 
| team1      = Deportivo Saprissa''' 
| score      = 5–0
| report     = 
| team2      =  Diriangén FC
| goals1     = Kénneth Vargas     
| goals2     = Nil| location   = 
| stadium    = Cacique Diriangén Stadium
| attendance = 
| referee    = 
| nobars     = Y
| note       = 
}}

Group 2
Guatemala City, Guatemala

Group 3
San Pedro Sula, Honduras

Final round
Los Angeles, USA

Semifinals

Third place

Final

 Deportivo Saprissa 2003 UNCAF champions. Deportivo Saprissa, Comunicaciones F.C., Liga Deportiva Alajuelense advance to 2004 CONCACAF Champions' Cup quarterfinals. As Guatemala were suspended by CONCACAF and FIFA in January 2004, the place of Comunicaciones F.C. was given to C.D. FAS (as second best runners-up in the group stage).''

References

UNCAF Interclub Cup
1
2003–04 in Honduran football
2003–04 in Guatemalan football
2003–04 in Costa Rican football
2003–04 in Salvadoran football
2003–04 in Nicaraguan football
2003–04 in Belizean football
2003–04 in Panamanian football